Hasanabad (also Romanized as Ḩasanābād; also known as Ḩasanābād-e Jūyom) is a village in Deh Fish Rural District, Banaruiyeh District, Larestan County, Fars Province, Iran. At the 2006 census, its population was 107, in 18 families.

References 

Populated places in Larestan County